The Neobatrachia (New Latin neo- ("new") + batrachia ("frogs")) are a suborder of the Anura, the order of frogs and toads.

This suborder is the most advanced and apomorphic of the three anuran suborders alive today, hence its name, which literally means "new frogs" (from the hellenic words neo, meaning "new" and batrachia, meaning "frogs"). It is also by far the largest of the three; its more than 5,000 different species make up over 96% of all living anurans.

The differentiation between Archaeobatrachia, Mesobatrachia, and Neobatrachia is based primarily on anatomic differences, especially the skeletal structure, as well as several visible characteristics and behaviors.

Systematics 
Separating the Anura into the Archaeo-, Meso- and Neobatrachia is somewhat controversial; as more research is done and more knowledge is gained, it is becoming even less clear, because many characteristics used for this differentiation apply to more than one group.

Neobatrachia are usually sorted into five superfamilies, but this division is also controversial, as some families are placed into different superfamilies by different authors. In addition, several families have been revealed to be paraphyletic and consequently divided to make them correspond to clades and thus be natural, evolutionary groups. This has approximately doubled the number of presently recognized neobatrachian families.

List of families 
The clades and families currently accepted in the Neobatrachia are:

 Superfamily Heleophrynoidea:
 Heleophrynidae – ghost frogs
 Clade Australobatrachia:
 Calyptocephalellidae - Chilean toads
 Superfamily Myobatrachoidea
 Limnodynastidae – Australian ground frogs
 Myobatrachidae – Australian froglets
 Superfamily Hyloidea:
 Allophrynidae - Tukeit hill frogs
 Amphignathodontidae – marsupial frogs (sometimes in Hemiphractidae)
 Alsodidae 
 Batrachylidae
 Clade Brachycephaloidea
 Brachycephalidae – saddleback toads
 Ceuthomantidae – emerald-barred frogs
 Craugastoridae Hedges, Duellmann & Heinicke, 2008 (formerly in Brachycephalidae)
 Eleutherodactylidae Lutz, 1954 (formerly in Brachycephalidae)
 Strabomantidae Hedges, Duellmann & Heinicke, 2008 (some formerly in Brachycephalidae)
 Bufonidae – true toads
 Centrolenidae  – glass frogs
 Ceratophryidae – horned toads
 Cycloramphidae
 Clade Dendrobatoidea
 Aromobatidae – skunk frog (sometimes in Dendrobatidae)
 Dendrobatidae – poison dart frogs
 Hemiphractidae – marsupial frogs 
 Hylidae – true tree frogs and relatives 
 Hylodidae – giant Neotropical torrent frogs
 Leiuperidae (sometimes in Leptodactylidae)
 Leptodactylidae – southern frogs, tropical frogs 
 Odontophrynidae
 Rhinodermatidae – Darwin's frogs 
 Telmatobiidae – water frogs
Superfamily Sooglossoidea:
Nasikabatrachidae – purple frogs
Sooglossidae – Seychelles frogs
Superfamily Ranoidea:
Microhylidae – narrow-mouthed frogs
Clade Afrobatrachia:
Arthroleptidae – squeakers
Brevicipitidae – rain frogs
Hemisotidae – shovelnose frogs
Hyperoliidae – sedge frogs, "bush frogs"
Clade Natatanura:
Ceratobatrachidae 
Conrauidae
Dicroglossidae – fork-tongued frogs
Micrixalidae – dancing frogs
Mantellidae – Malagasy frogs
Nyctibatrachidae – night frogs
Odontobatrachidae
Petropedetidae – torrent frogs
Phrynobatrachidae – puddle frogs
Ptychadenidae – grassland frogs
Pyxicephalidae 
Ranidae  – true frogs 
 Ranixalidae –  Indian frogs
 Rhacophoridae – shrub frogs, "bush frogs", "moss frogs"

References

Further reading

 
.
Amphibian suborders
Extant Aptian first appearances